Ch'uychu (Quechua for humid, Hispanicized spelling Chuycho) is a mountain in the Cordillera Central in the Andes of Peru which reaches an altitude of approximately . It is located in the Junín Region, Jauja Province, Canchayllo District, and in the Yauli Province, Suitucancha District, southeast of Suitucancha.

References

Mountains of Peru
Mountains of Junín Region